The Yamaha Zuma 125 is a scooter introduced by Yamaha Motor Company in September 2008 and updated in 2016. It is a 125 cc version of its smaller 49cc cousin, the Zuma. Outside the United States it is known as the Yamaha BW's 125.

Model information

The body design of the Zuma 125 is similar to the Zuma in respect to its overall form and dual headlight configuration. Its size is slightly larger, and it includes a metal bracket around the headlights. The Taiwanese, Japanese and South American models have stacked front lights with a single headlight. The bulbs used are HS1 styled halogen lights.

It is intended as a street-bike, with the capacity for handling light off-road conditions such as unpaved roads. Many of the design components like the steel frame, wide tires, oiled-type air filters, robust shocks, and front/rear off-road-style brush deflectors were included to facilitate both riding conditions.

Engine
The engine is a 123 cc 4-stroke SOHC 4-valve with 10:1 compression. The fuel injection system is similar to the ones installed on most Yamaha bikes, and uses a 24mm injector. The exhaust manifold comes equipped with an O2 sensor.

This same engine (minus the fuel injection) is also used in Yamaha's Cygnus-X scooter. There is currently an established aftermarket with numerous parts that allow the engine to be enlarged up to 287 cc.

2016 Update
The bike was updated technically and cosmetically in 2016. The dual headlamps were replaced by a single unit.

References

External links
 
 
 Yamaha official Zuma home
 2020 Yamaha Zuma 125 specifications

Zuma 125
Motor scooters
Motorcycles introduced in 2009